The 1953 season was the Hawthorn Football Club's 29th season in the Victorian Football League and 52nd overall.

Fixture

Lightning Premiership

The lightning premiership was played between rounds 6 and 7.

Premiership Season

Ladder

References

Hawthorn Football Club seasons